Ana Valle (born ) is a Mexican female volleyball player. She is a member of the Mexico women's national volleyball team and played for Distrito Federal in 2014. 

She was part of the Mexico national team at the 2014 FIVB Volleyball Women's World Championship in Italy.

Clubs
  Distrito Federal (2014)

References

1996 births
Living people
Mexican women's volleyball players
Place of birth missing (living people)